Enjouée was an Infidèle-class 32-gun frigate of the French Navy, built on a design by Jean-Joseph Ginoux.

Career 
Enjouée was tasked with testing one of the first marine chronometers, by Pierre Le Roy, to ascertain whether it allowed measurements of longitude precise enough for navigation, after preliminary testing on Aurore. The test was successful and Le Roy was awarded a prize in recognition of his invention.

Enjouée was hulked at Brest in 1777 and broken up in 1783.

Notes, citations, and references 
Notes

Citations

References
 
 

  (1671-1870)

1766 ships
Ships built in France